McPhee, McPhie, MacPhee or Macphee is a Scottish surname. Like MacFie, it is usually regarded as a shorter version of McDuffie, which is an anglicisation of the Scottish Gaelic name mac Dhuibhshithe ("descendant of the dark fairy") and originated in Colonsay. However, it may instead be derived from another Gaelic name, mac a' Phì; hence it may have the same origins as surnames such as Fee, MacFee, McFee, Macfee, MacAfee and Mahaffey.

People
McPhee
Adam McPhee (born 1982), Australian rules football player
Angus McPhee (1916–1997), Scottish outsider artist from the island of South Uist
Archie McPhee, Seattle-based novelty dealer owned by Mark Pahlow
Bid McPhee (1859–1943), American Major League Baseball second baseman
Brian McPhee (born 1970), Scottish footballer
Bruce McPhee (1927–2009), former Australian motor racing driver
Cathy-Ann McPhee (born 1959), Gaelic singer
Charles McPhee (1962–2011), researcher, author, nationally syndicated talk radio host
Chris McPhee (born 1983), English footballer
Christina McPhee (born 1954), American painter, new media and video artist
Colin McPhee (1900–1964), Canadian composer and musicologist
Frank McPhee, long-time Glasgow gangland boss
 Frank McPhee (American football) (1931-2011), American football player
George McPhee (born 1958), the general manager of the National Hockey League's Vegas Golden Knights
George Washington McPhee (1880–1971), lawyer, judge, political figure in Prince Edward Island and Saskatchewan
Gloria McPhee (1926 – 2007), Bermudian politician 
Hilary McPhee, Australian publisher, editor and businessperson
Ian McPhee (born 1961), Scottish former professional footballer
Joe McPhee (born 1939), American jazz multi-instrumentalist
John McPhee (born 1931), American writer, pioneer of creative nonfiction
John McPhee (footballer) (born 1937), Scottish former professional footballer
John McPhee (motorcycle racer) (born 1994), British Grand Prix motorcycle racer
John McPhee (politician), KCMG (1878–1952), Australian politician, member of the Tasmanian House of Assembly
Katharine McPhee (born 1984), American pop singer, songwriter and actress
Kodi Smit-McPhee (born 1996), Australian actor
Laura McPhee (born 1958), Boston-based American photographer
Lawrence McPhee (1899–1983), American football player and coach
Mark McPhee (born 1964), Australian cricketer
Martha McPhee, American novelist
Michele McPhee (born 1970), American author, talk radio host, and journalist
Mike McPhee (born 1960), retired Canadian ice hockey forward
Paul McPhee, American artist living in Martha’s Vineyard Island
Pernell McPhee (born 1988), American football defensive end
 Peter McPhee (cricketer) (born 1963), Australian cricketer
 Peter McPhee (footballer) (born 1934), Australian rules footballer
Peter McPhee (academic), Australian academic, formerly Provost of the University of Melbourned
Scott McPhee (born 1992), Australian cyclist, who pilots Kieran Modra in tandem cycling
Sianoa Smit-McPhee (born 1992), Australian actress
Sidney A. McPhee, American educator, currently President of Middle Tennessee State University
Simon McPhee (born 1969), Australian rules football coach
Stephanie Pearl-McPhee (born 1968), Canadian writer, knitter, IBCLC and doula 
Stephen McPhee (born 1981), Scottish former footballer
Tony McPhee (born 1944), English blues guitarist, and founder of The Groundhogs
Tony McPhee (footballer) (1914–1960), Scottish footballer and football manager

MacPhee
Catherine-Ann MacPhee (born 1959), Scottish Gaelic singer
Ian Macphee (born 1938), Australian former politician, member of the House of Representatives from 1974 to 1990
Josh MacPhee, artist, curator and activist living in Brooklyn, New York
Niall MacPhee (born 1985), shinty player from Fort William, Scotland
Rebecca Jean MacPhee (born 1974), Canadian curler
Robyn MacPhee (born 1983), Canadian curler
Waddy MacPhee (1899–1980), former professional baseball player and American football player

In fiction
 Andrew MacPhee, a rationalist sceptic in That Hideous Strength by C. S. Lewis
Characters in Dawson's Creek:
Andie McPhee, portrayed by Meredith Monroe
Jack McPhee, portrayed by Kerr Smith
Nanny McPhee, in the 2005 film and Nanny McPhee and the Big Bang, a 2010 sequel.
Floss McPhee, in the Australian soap opera Home and Away played by Sheila Kennelly

Other
McPhee Reservoir, in Montezuma County, Colorado.
McPhee Gribble, Australian publisher.
 McPhee station, a railroad station on the Soo Line in Michigan, USA.

See also
Clan Macfie - Scottish clan, of which McPhee is considered an associated name
MacPherson

References

Scottish surnames

ru:McPhee